Mut-Ashkur (a Hurrian name) was possibly a king of Assyria, or just Ekallatum, in the 18th century BC. He was the son and successor of Ishme-Dagan. His father arranged for him to marry the daughter of the Hurrian king Zaziya.

References

18th-century BC Assyrian kings